The Lenovo ThinkPad 25th anniversary edition is a laptop manufactured by Lenovo for the 25th anniversary of the ThinkPad line.

Hardware 
This model was based on a ThinkPad T470 model and has a limited compatibility of case parts.

References 

Lenovo laptops
ThinkPad